Clouds is the first studio album by Dutch ambient group Gaussian Curve, released in 2015.

Track listing

References

2015 albums
Music from Memory albums
Gaussian Curve (band) albums